Frelinghuysen  is a surname of Dutch origin.  Several of its members formed the Frelinghuysen family of New Jersey politicians.  It may also refer to:

People

People with the surname
Frederick Frelinghuysen (general) (1753–1804), U.S. Army general and New Jersey politician
Frederick Frelinghuysen (businessman) (1848–1924), Insurance company president
Frederick Frelinghuysen (lawyer) (1788–1820), lawyer who married Jane Dumont
Frederick Theodore Frelinghuysen (1817–1885), U.S. senator and Secretary of State
George Griswold Frelinghuysen (1851-1936), of Ballantine beer
John Frelinghuysen (minister) (1727–1754), American clergyman and son of Theodorus Jacobus Frelinghuysen
John Frederick Frelinghuysen (1776–1833), U.S. Army general and lawyer
Joseph Sherman Frelinghuysen, Sr. (1869–1948), U.S. senator from New Jersey
Joseph Sherman Frelinghuysen, Jr. (1912-2005), U.S. soldier, prisoner of war, author, and businessman
Peter Hood Ballantine Frelinghuysen II (1916-2011), U.S. congressman from New Jersey
Rodney Frelinghuysen (born 1946), U.S. congressman from New Jersey
Suzy Frelinghuysen (née Estelle, 1911-1988), American artist
Theodore Frelinghuysen (1787–1862) New Jersey Attorney General, U.S. senator, and mayor of Newark, New Jersey
Theodorus Jacobus Frelinghuysen (1691–1748), Dutch immigrant to U.S. and theologian
Theodorus Jacobus Frelinghuysen II (1724–1761), theologian

People with the given name
Carl Frelinghuysen Gould (1873-1939), American architect
Theodore Frelinghuysen Jewell (1844-1932), U.S. Navy admiral
Theodore Frelinghuysen Seward (1835-1902), American musician, writer and educator
Theodore Frelinghuysen Singiser (1845–1907), American politician

Places
 Frelinghuysen Township, New Jersey
 Frelinghuysen Avenue in Newark, New Jersey
 Frelinghuysen Road in Piscataway, New Jersey

Things
Frelinghuysen Arboretum, Morristown, New Jersey
Frelinghuysen Hall, College Avenue, Rutgers-New Brunswick (Residence Hall)
General John Frelinghuysen House, building on the National Register of Historic Places in Raritan, New Jersey
Frelinghuysen University, a defunct historically Black university in Washington, D.C.

See also
Johann Anastasius Freylinghausen

External links
Frelinghuysen Family Archive